Thomas Cook (22 November 1808 – 18 July 1892) was an English businessman. He is best known for founding the travel agency Thomas Cook & Son.  He was also one of the initial developers of the "package tour" including travel, accommodations, and the like.

Early life 
Thomas Cook was born on 22 November 1808, to John and Elizabeth Cook, who lived at 9 Quick Close in the village of Melbourne, Derbyshire. At the age of 10, Cook started working as an assistant to a local market gardener on Lord Melbourne's estate. In 1828,  he became a Baptist missionary and toured the region as a village evangelist and distributing pamphlets and, in the 1830s, he became involved in the temperance movement.

On 2 March 1833, Cook married Marianne Mason (1807–1884) at the parish church in Barrowden in Rutland. A son, John Mason Cook, was born on 13 January 1834. A daughter, Annie Elizabeth, born on 21 June 1845, died in a bath aged 35 after inhaling poisonous fumes from a faulty water heater.

Cook's first excursions 

With the opening of the extended Midland Counties Railway, he arranged to take a group of temperance campaigners from Leicester Campbell Street railway station to a teetotal rally in Loughborough, eleven miles away. On 5 July 1841, Thomas Cook escorted around 485 people, who paid one shilling each for the return train journey, on his first excursion. This is sometimes reported as the world's first railway excursion; however this is incorrect as Grosmont church (Whitby) had already organised an excursion as a fund raiser in 1839.

On 4 August 1845 he arranged for a party to travel from Leicester to Liverpool. In 1846, he took 350 people from Leicester on a tour of Scotland. In 1851 he arranged for 150,000 people to travel to the Great Exhibition in London. Four years later, he planned his first excursion abroad, when he took two groups on a 'grand circular tour' of Belgium, Germany and France, ending in Paris for the Exhibition.

The Thomas Cook statue outside Leicester Railway Station, London Road, Leicester was unveiled on 14 January 1994 by his great-great-grandson Thomas Cook. It was sculpted by James Butler RA.

He was awarded the Serbian Order of Saint Sava.

Thomas Cook & Son 
Thomas Cook acquired business premises on Fleet Street, London in 1865. The office also contained a shop which sold essential travel accessories, including guide books, luggage, telescopes and footwear. In 1872, he formed a partnership with his son, John Mason Andrew  Cook, and renamed the travel agency as Thomas Cook & Son.

In accordance with his beliefs, he and his wife also ran a small temperance hotel above the office. Their business model was refined by the introduction of the 'hotel coupon' in 1868. Detachable coupons in a counterfoil book were issued to the traveller. These were valid for either a restaurant meal or an overnight hotel stay provided they were on Cook's list.

Conflicts between father and son were resolved when the son persuaded his father, Thomas Cook, to retire at the end of 1878. Thomas Cook moved back at Thorncroft, Knighton, Leicester, where he died on 18 July 1892, having been afflicted with blindness in his declining years. He was buried there on 22 July 1892.

Legacy – Thomas Cook and mass tourism

Thomas Cook was a frontrunner of establishing tourism systems and thus made mass tourism possible in Italy. First, the circular tickets could be used on almost all Italian railways. These tickets allowed travel by train for a preset number of days along predetermined routes. Second, Cook designed a series of hotel coupons to complement circular tickets, which could be exchanged for lodging and meals at designated accommodations. Last, he introduced the circular notes which could be changed at designated hotels, banks, and tickets agents for Italian lira at a predetermined exchange rate. Cook's introduction of tourism-specific currency facilitated easier and effective trips within Italy. Also, by introducing a widely dispersed coupon system, Cook "helped to stabilize the burgeoning Italian economy not only by increasing the revenues from tourism but also by expanding the circulation of Italy's new currency, the lira." The coupon system spread rapidly and was well accepted throughout Italian cities. Furthermore, thanks to this system, middle class Italians could afford to travel more frequently and more easily.

See also
 Thomas Cook European Timetable
 Cook's Travellers Handbooks

References

Citations

General sources 
 
 
 Usherwood, Stephen. "Travel Agents Extraordinary." History Today (Sep 1972), Vol. 22 Issue 9, pp. 649–655; online; coverage of father and son to 1899.

External links 

 Thomas Cook Biography
 Rare Travel Poster: Cook's Nile & Palestine Tours Shapell Manuscript Foundation
 Thomas Cook Responds to Travel Testimonial: Original Letter
 Article about Thomas Cook

1808 births
1892 deaths
English blind people
British hospitality businesspeople
Burials at Welford Road Cemetery
Businesspeople in tourism
English Baptists
English carpenters
English chief executives
English company founders
Recipients of the Order of St. Sava
People from Melbourne, Derbyshire
English Protestant missionaries
English evangelicals
19th-century Baptists
19th-century English businesspeople